Adolphus XI of Schauenburg (1401 – 4 December 1459), as Adolph I Duke of Schleswig (formerly ), and as Adolph VIII Count of Holstein-Rendsburg, was the mightiest vassal of the Danish realm.

Background
Adolph descended from a branch of the House of Schauenburg, who had for centuries been counts of Holstein, and as such, vassals of the Holy Roman Empire. His great-grandfather Gerhard the Great, having also been a Regent of the Kingdom of Denmark, had received the Duchy of Sønderjylland from the Danish crown as a hereditary fief. It had been lost for the Schauenburgs between 1330 and 1375, with Queen Margaret I of Denmark restricting the regained ducal power in 1386, and again from 1414 to 1440.

Count Adolph's parents were Gerhard VI, Count of Holstein-Rendsburg and Catherine Elisabeth of Brunswick-Lüneburg.  Adolph was only three years old when his father was killed in action against the Ditmarsians in the Battle at Hamme near Heide (today's Schleswig-Holstein), on 4 August 1404. Adolph was educated at the court of Frederick I, Margrave of Brandenburg.

Career
Adolph's elder brother Henry IV succeeded their father. As Duke of Schleswig, he was under the tutelage of the Danish crown due to his minority until 1414. However, then the crown denied Henry's claim to dukedom. Henry and his mother and brothers stood together and fought for his claim. During the Danish-Holstein-Hanseatic war Henry was killed in action beleaguering Flensburg on 28 May 1427.

Adolph and his younger brother Gerhard VII then succeeded Henry as Counts of Holstein-Rendsburg, continuing their efforts to receive the Duchy of Schleswig. However, Gerhard died in 1433 in Emmerich upon Rhine. In July 1435 Adolph and the Danish King Eric of Pomerania concluded the second Treaty of Vordingborg at Vordingborg Castle, confirming Adolph's de facto holdings in Schleswig duchy. In 1439, the new Danish King Christopher III acquired the loyalty of Adolph by granting him the entire Duchy of Schleswig as a hereditary Danish fief. Adolph's lands were located in both sides of the border between Denmark and the Holy Roman Empire.

The current branch of Danish royal house became extinct in 1448 with the death of Christopher III of Denmark. Adolph was a cognatic descendant of King Eric V of Denmark, whose mother Queen Dowager Margaret Sambiria had obtained a papal confirmation of the right of also female descendancy of Christopher I of Denmark to succeed to the throne of Denmark. Adolph was also the cognatic descendant of King Abel of Denmark through his daughter Sophia; Christopher III was the last descendant of King Abel's sons.
The throne was offered by the Rigsråd to Adolph, who as Duke of Schleswig, was the vassal with the biggest holdings in the Danish realm. Adolph, by that time old and childless, declined and supported the candidacy of his own nephew the Count of Oldenburg who became Christian I of Denmark.

Adolph was married on 5 March 1435, to Margaret of Höllenstein of the German noble family of Hohnstein. They had one son, who died young. In 1459 Adolph died and left no descendants to inherit.  His sisters were the late Helvig (Hedwig), who was married with Dietrich, Count of Oldenburg and had left children, and the elderly Ingeborg of Holstein, Abbess of Vadstena, who lived as a nun and was both unmarried and childless. His brother Gerhard had mixed twins, with the son Henry drowned still young and the daughter Catherine a nun in Preetz Priory. There were several claimants to Holstein-Rendsburg and Schleswig, since then the Schauenburgs still continued to rule the County of Holstein-Pinneberg in the male line, and several extinct lines of the family, counts of different parts of Holstein, had left female offspring and their cognatic heirs. Adolph's branch was not genealogically very senior.

The representatives of Schleswig and Holstein (nobility and some delegates of the Estates) convened in Ribe where, on 5 March 1460, the succession was confirmed to Christian I of Denmark, the eldest nephew of the late Duke of Schleswig and Count of Holstein-Rendsburg.

Seal

His seal shows the coats-of-arms of Schleswig (two lions) and Holstein (the so-called stylised nettle leaf). The inscription says: SIGILLUM*ADOLPHI*DUCIS*SLEVICENSIS*HOLTSACIE*COMITIS (Seal • of Adolphus • Duke • of Schleswig • Holstein's • Count)

Ancestry

See also
Treaty of Ribe
History of Schleswig-Holstein

References

Sources
This article derives mainly from the Salmon Konversationsleksikon 2nd edition (JH Schultz Forlag. 1915 to 1930).
Die Fürsten des Landes: Herzöge und Grafen von Schleswig, Holstein und Lauenburg [De slevigske hertuger; German], Carsten Porskrog Rasmussen (ed.) on behalf of the Gesellschaft für Schleswig-Holsteinische Geschichte, Neumünster: Wachholtz, 2008, .

Other sources
Gregersen, H. V.  (1981) Slesvig og Holsten før 1830 (Politiken)  Danish
Trap J. P.  (1975)  Hertugdømmet Slesvig (Selskabet for Udgivelse af Kilder til Dansk Historie)   Danish
Pulsiano, Phillip; Wolf, Kirsten  (1993) Medieval Scandinavia: An Encyclopedia (Taylor & Francis)  

Adolf 01
House of Schauenburg
Counts of Holstein
Medieval Danish nobility
15th-century Danish people
1401 births
1459 deaths